Pseudomonas oryzihabitans is a nonfermenting yellow-pigmented, gram-negative, rod-shaped bacterium that can cause sepsis, peritonitis, endophthalmitis, and bacteremia. It is an opportunistic pathogen of humans and warm-blooded animals that is commonly found in several environmental sources, from soil to rice paddies.  They can be distinguished from other nonfermenters by their negative oxidase reaction and aerobic character.  This organism can infect individuals that have major illnesses, including those undergoing surgery or with catheters in their body. Based on the 16S RNA analysis, these bacteria have been placed in the Pseudomonas putida group.

History
Part of the genus Pseudomonas, originally described in 1894, these bacteria were first identified in urine and gastrointestinal specimens in 1928 by two scientists, E.G. Dresel and O Stickl.  At first, this organism was named Chromobacterium typhiflavuum because it closely resembled the bacteria that caused enteric fever.  The name change to Pseudomonas oryzihabitans occurred in 1985 after scientist Kentaro Kodama and his team isolated the bacteria from a rice field and found that it had a phenotypic similarity to the pseudomonas organisms.  This organism has also been isolated in the hospital environment from a wide variety of sites such as wounds, eyes, skin, ears, and several other places, although they can be found in damp environments as well.  As of today, there is little known about the pathogenic qualities of P. oryzihabitans, so possible virulent strains cannot be described or identified absolutely.

Pathogenesis
Pseudomonas oryzihabitans, although an uncommon pathogen, is able to cause infections in individuals that usually have compromised immune systems.  While most strains of this bacteria do not cause infections, the patients that acquire P. oryzihabitans most likely have an underlying disease, and it spreads while the patients are hospitalized.  This includes patients that have recently undergone surgery and also those affected by diseases such as AIDS, leukemia, and other illnesses that have a detrimental effect on the immune system.

From several studies involving cases of P. oryzihabitans, research reveals that there is a close relationship between infection, underlying disease, and the presence of catheters in patients.  This means that infections occur most in people that have debilitating disease and have artificial material located in their bodies.  Along with catheters, P. oryzihabitans are most commonly found at sites involved with respiratory equipment and devices for continuous ambulatory dialysis, and these bacteria can spread through contaminated fluids and unsterilized or defiled medical tools.  If this is the case, it is important for hygiene to be maintained internally and externally to help stop the spread of the bacteria and prevent infectious disease.  Infections can be either nosocomially acquired, which means that the bacteria originated during a patient's duration in the hospital forty-eight hours after admittance, or they are community-acquired, which means that the patient had evidence of infection before admission or during the first forty-eight hours in the hospital.

Most infections result in bacteraemia in patients that are extremely sick or peritonitis in individuals that undergo ambulatory peritoneal dialysis consistently.  Several reports of infections these bacteria cause are correlated with patients who have AIDS. P. oryzihabitans is increasingly identified as a cause of opportunistic infections, taking advantage of weak immune systems in people.  However, it is rare for the infection to escalate into sepsis, but there have been cases where patients have acquired the disease. Although these bacteria are able to cause infections, its role as a pathogen is questionable since this does not happen very often.

Diagnosis/symptoms
Symptoms of an infection of P. oryzihabitans are actually quite vague and similar to the signs that can indicate other illnesses or diseases, so it is relatively difficult to identify when only looking at symptoms.  However, in several cases, these infections result after an individual's immune system has been weakened, so it is likely to occur in recovering or ill patients.  Most patients, after receiving treatment for another disease or during recovery from surgery, experience chills and increase in body temperature.  While these symptoms could mean a variety of things, it is clear that the patient's recovery is halted and that there is an infection of some sort.  In an example where a woman developed an infection of P. oryzihabitans from a case of sinusitis, she experienced the same chills and elevated temperature, but also nasal discharge containing pus, right facial pain, and a fever.

To establish that these patients are infected with Pseudomonas oryzihabitans, blood samples are collected for tests and sent for cultures to be identified.  Since the presence of these bacteria may not initially be known by any symptoms, having it identified in a lab will help with treating it.  In certain situations, its role as a pathogen is also identified through evidence of pulmonary signs and symptoms, radiograph findings, and positive blood cultures.

Treatment
In the past reported cases of P. oryzihabitans, the patients were given antibiotics to treat the infection.  These bacteria are fairly easy to treat, with a range of antibiotics that they are susceptible to.  The antibiotics that the infectious disease responded to are gentamicin, ciprofloxacin, carbapenems, cephalosprins, aminoglycosides, and quinolones.  While there are several kinds of medicines that can treat P. oryzihabitans, the carbapenem displayed the best results against infections.  In a study where cultures of these bacteria were grown, tests showed that all the isolates were susceptible to carbapenem antibiotics, however, the vulnerability to other medicines differed among the groups.  Past studies also revealed that P. oryzihabitans were susceptible in vitro to antipseudomonal penicillins.  Treatments for the bacteria differ and depend on the host and the different strains of P. oryzihabitans.

Resistance
The types of antibiotics that P. oryzihabitans are resistant to ampicillin, amoxicillin-clavulanic acid, and cefazolin.  Since these bacteria are not as harmful or virulent to the host, antibiotics should clear up the infection, although in some cases, since they can be found around the sites of prosthetic material, catheter removal is required.

Prevention
In order to prevent an infection from these bacteria, good hygiene is required, especially when foreign materials or objects like catheters are in the body.  However, even this cannot completely prevent P. oryzihabitans because of environmental contamination that could lead to acquirement of this organism.

In cases of patients with indwelling catheters, special care should be taken so that a community-acquired infection does not occur.  It is recommended that these people should avoid the use of bath sponges and wet items for skin care, as these can be sites of growth and contamination of the bacteria.

Ecology
By studying the environments in which P. oryzihabitans are found, scientists are able to get a clearer picture on how infections occur and how these bacteria may be found on individuals outside hospitals.  Although the bacteria can be nosocomially acquired, the environment must be taken into account as a host for them.  These bacteria, while observed in hospital sites, can originally be found in damp environments such as locations with water, stagnant or running, and soil.  Data indicates that environmental sources could be a reason for the development of an infectious disease, as well as the presence of foreign objects in the body.

These bacteria were first studied in depth and identified after they were isolated from a rice paddy.

In one study, researchers found that P. oryzihabitans contaminated drinking water supply and questioned whether or not these bacteria are commonly found in naturally distributed water.  The water supply systems were in contact with an object that is directly connected to sinkholes, which are known sites for the bacteria to linger.  Since sinkholes are large underground cavities, they have enough room to foster water, making this environment an ideal place for P. oryzihabitans to grow.

These bacteria are able to persist in biofilms where they are relatively protected from chlorine disinfection.
Their presence in drinking water is attributable to this fact.

When an infection caused by P. oryzihabitans was reported in a patient with AIDS and an indwelling catheter, scientists took samples from the man's home to see where these bacteria were located and to find out a possible explanation for his infection.  The patient claimed that he followed the strict hygienic guidelines pertaining to catheters, so an environmental factor is responsible for the infection.  They ended up tracing the origin of the bacteria to a bath sponge.  In order for researchers to validate these findings, they also tested bath sponges from other households and found P. oryzihabitans in some separate samples as well.  This suggests that the water could be contaminated with these bacteria, which in turn, could lead to potential infections in certain individuals.

Clinical significance
Infections from P. oryzihabitans are increasingly associated with catheter-related bacteremia, peritonitis, wound infections, and meningitis (after surgery), mostly in patients with diseases that significantly weaken the individual.

Foreign material present in the body predisposes patients to infections, as well as those with severely weakened immune systems.

Most cases are nosocomially acquired, however, there are infections detected upon admission to a hospital.  There are also cases where P. oryzihabitans was a causation of sepsis in some people.  The only other oxidase negative Pseudomonas is P. luteola.

Physiology
The cells of Pseudomonas oryzihabitans are rods with rounded ends. These Gram-negative bacteria are able to move due to a flagellum, and the cells occur singularly and very rarely in pairs.  Strains of these bacteria produce a yellow water-insoluble pigment in their cells.

Their metabolism is restricted to an aerobic respiratory system. They are oxidative but not fermentative, and when isolated and cultured, their growth occurs on MacConkey agar and SS agar.

References

External links
 Type strain of Pseudomonas oryzihabitans at BacDive -  the Bacterial Diversity Metadatabase

Pseudomonadales
Bacterial plant pathogens and diseases
Bacteria described in 1985